Paul Hockings (born February 23, 1935) is an anthropologist whose prime areas of focus are the Dravidian languages, social, visual and medical anthropology.

He studied archaeology and anthropology at the University of Sydney, the University of California, Berkeley, and at the universities in Chicago, Stanford and Toronto. He taught anthropology at the University of California, Los Angeles and the University of Illinois at Chicago, and he has been the dean of United International College's Faculty of Social Sciences and Humanities. He is the current editor-in-chief of Visual Anthropology.

Early life and family
Hockings was born on February 23, 1935, at Hertford and was raised in Hampshire, England. At the age of ten years, he developed interest in prehistory and museums. His father Arthur Hockings, a Londoner, was a cricketer and an engineer, who worked as a personal assistant for Henry Royce. Later, he helped design landing-craft for D-Day. In 1952, Paul migrated to Australia with his parents.

Education
Hockings studied Near-Eastern archaeology at the University of Sydney, and completed two majors in the subjects of archaeology and anthropology at that university. In 1962, after receiving a grant for field studies from American Institute of Indian Studies, he moved to the Nilgiris in India and did research on the Badagas of the Nilgiris, completing a Ph.D. on this subject in 1965. He also studied anthropology at the universities of Chicago, Stanford, Toronto, and at the University of California, Berkeley.

Career and research
Hockings made the first film in the style of Observational Cinema, named, The Village. In 1969, he was signed as an anthropologist by the MGM Studios for making a film on mankind's origins, titled "The Man Hunters", for NBC television which drew a large North American audience. He was then working as a research director for MGM Documentary Dept. About the same tine he served as the last research assistant for Ruth St. Denis, and was on an expedition to India with the photographer Alfred Eisenstaedt. For over 30 years he has been the chief editor of Visual Anthropology; and the University of Oslo has described him as "a pioneer in the fields of ethnographic film and visual anthropology".

Hockings is a professor emeritus of anthropology from the University of Illinois at Chicago. He worked at the University of California, Berkeley as a research assistant for David G. Mandelbaum, and taught anthropology at the University of California, Los Angeles, before moving to Chicago. For a brief period he worked at the Museum of Anthropology at the University of British Columbia, and as a script writer, journalist and librarian in New Zealand and Canada. He served in China as the dean of Social Sciences and Humanities at the United International College in Zhuhai, and in Chicago as a Field Museum of Natural History's adjunct curator of anthropology.

He has studied the cultures of South India, and has been working with the Badagas for more than 50 years. He has researched their medical anthropology, culture and language.

Awards
In 2015, he was awarded the Nilgiris Lifetime Achievement Award by the Nilgiri Documentation Centre; and in 2016, a Lifetime Achievement Award of the Society for Visual Anthropology.

Works
Hockings made several documentaries and published about 20 books and more than 200 papers.

Books

Selected papers

Documentaries

See also
Colin Young
David G. Mandelbaum

References

External links

1935 births
University of Sydney alumni
University of California, Berkeley alumni
University of California, Los Angeles faculty
University of Illinois Chicago faculty
Anthropological linguists
Visual anthropologists
Medical anthropologists
Anthropology educators
21st-century anthropologists
English anthropologists
English documentary filmmakers
Living people